Zvenigorodsky Uyezd (Звенигородский уезд) was one of the subdivisions of the Moscow Governorate of the Russian Empire. It was situated in the central part of the governorate. Its administrative centre was Zvenigorod.

Demographics
At the time of the Russian Empire Census of 1897, Zvenigorodsky Uyezd had a population of 84,375. Of these, 98.9% spoke Russian, 0.3% Ukrainian, 0.2% Polish, 0.2% Lithuanian, 0.1% Yiddish, 0.1% German, 0.1% Belarusian, 0.1% Latvian and 0.1% Tatar as their native language.

References

 
Uezds of Moscow Governorate
Moscow Governorate